Panfilovo is a rural locality (a village) in Nagornoye Rural Settlement, Petushinsky District, Vladimir Oblast, Russia. The population was 131 as of 2010. There are 6 streets.

Geography 
Panfilovo is located on the Sheredar River, 32 km northwest of Petushki (the district's administrative centre) by road. Zabolotye is the nearest rural locality.

References 

Rural localities in Petushinsky District